Zahir Shah (1947 – 13 June 2017) was a Pakistani film actor working in Lollywood. He is best known for playing villainous roles in Punjabi films. He has been credited with working in over 600 films. He was introduced to film industry through the film Yaari Dosti by director Altaf Hussain. Later in his career, Shah also briefly worked at theater as an stage actor.

Death
Shah died on 14 June 2017 at the age of 70 in a hospital at Lahore. He was buried at a graveyard Sargodha, Sargodha.

Filmography 
Shah has worked in following films:
 Budha Sher (Punjabi - Color - Friday, 12 July 2002)
	Double Cross (Urdu - Color - Wednesday, 13 August 1980)
 Geo Shera (Punjabi - Black & White - Friday, 5 June 1981)
 Halaku Khan (Pashto - Color - Friday, 6 January 1995)
 Hitler (Punjabi - Color - Monday, 9 June 1986)
 Ilaqa Incharge (Punjabi - Color - Friday, 27 April 1984)
 Imtehan (Pashto - Black & White - Friday, 15 April 1983)
	Karma (Punjabi - Color - Friday, 16 June 1989)
	Malka (Punjabi - Color - Friday, 7 August 1987)
 Marshal (Punjabi - Color - Wednesday, 4 July 1990)
	Miss Allah Rakhi (Punjabi - Color - Sunday, 7 May 1989)
 Remand (Punjabi - Color - Friday, 27 April 1979)
 Shikra (Punjabi - Color - Thursday, 20 June 1985)
 Yaari Dosti
 Jaanbaaz
 Qatil
 Remaand
 Shehnai
 Zulm Da Toofan
 1981 - Khan-e-Azam
 1984 - Kalia
 1993 - Zabata

References 

1947 births
2017 deaths
Pakistani male film actors
Male actors in Punjabi cinema